Valerian Borisovich Savelyev (born 22 October 1962) is a Russian football coach and a former player.

References

1962 births
Living people
Soviet footballers
FC Dynamo Stavropol players
FC Fakel Voronezh players
Russian footballers
FC Lokomotiv Nizhny Novgorod players
Russian Premier League players
Russian football managers
Association football midfielders
FC Dynamo Vologda players